Medven Glacier is a 2.5 km long and 1.5 km wide glacier on Ioannes Paulus II Peninsula, Livingston Island in the South Shetland Islands, Antarctica situated east of Etar Snowfield, south of Urdoviza Glacier and north of Berkovitsa Glacier.  It is bounded by the east slopes of Oryahovo Heights  and drains eastwards into Prisoe Cove, Hero Bay between Remetalk Point and Agüero Point.  Bulgarian mapping in 2005 and 2009.
  
The glacier is named after the settlement of Medven in the eastern Balkan Mountains, Bulgaria.

Location

See also
 List of glaciers in the Antarctic
 Glaciology

Map
 L.L. Ivanov. Antarctica: Livingston Island and Greenwich, Robert, Snow and Smith Islands. Scale 1:120000 topographic map.  Troyan: Manfred Wörner Foundation, 2009.

References
 Medven Glacier. SCAR Composite Antarctic Gazetteer
 Bulgarian Antarctic Gazetteer. Antarctic Place-names Commission. (details in Bulgarian, basic data in English)

External links
 Medven Glacier. Copernix satellite image

Glaciers of Livingston Island